Five Minutes or 5 Minutes may refer to:

 Five Minutes (novel), an 1856 novel by Brazilian writer José de Alencar
 "Five Minutes" (Bonzo Goes to Washington song), a 1984 single by Jerry Harrison, Bootsy Collins and Daniel Lazarus
 "Five Minutes" (Lorrie Morgan song)
 "5 Minutes" (Lil' Mo song)
 "5 Minutes" (The Stranglers song)
 "5 Minutes" (Tinie Tempah song)